Alfred W. Johnson may refer to:

 Vice Admiral Alfred Wilkinson Johnson, a US naval officer in the Spanish–American War and World War I
 Alfred W. Johnson, 1973 recipient of the Brewster Medal
 Alfred Webb-Johnson, 1st Baron Webb-Johnson, the first (and only) Baron Webb-Johnson